Stążki may refer to the following places:
Stążki, Kuyavian-Pomeranian Voivodeship (north-central Poland)
Stążki, Kartuzy County in Pomeranian Voivodeship (north Poland)
Stążki, Sztum County in Pomeranian Voivodeship (north Poland)